Katrang is a village in Leylek District of Batken Region of Kyrgyzstan. Its population was 7,149 in 2021. A nearby village is Ravat (9 miles).

Population

References

External links 

Satellite map at Maplandia.com

Populated places in Batken Region